Big Brother Brasil 17 is the seventeenth season of Big Brother Brasil which premiered January 23, 2017 on the Rede Globo. The show is produced by Endemol Globo and presented by Tiago Leifert.

The grand prize is R$1.5 million with tax allowances, plus a R$150,000 prize offered to the runner-up and a R$50,000 prize offered to the housemate in third place. On Day 81, 20 year old Emilly Araújo won the series.

Housemates
The cast list with the first housemates was unveiled on January 18, 2017.

As announced by Rede Globo on January 18, four contestants, two doubles of twins, enter before of other competitors in the house and will dispute as two final spots of the edition. The public decides between a brother of each pair to enter the game.

Future appearances

In 2017, Marcos Harter appeared in A Fazenda 9, he finished the season as Runner-Up.

Voting history

Legends

Notes 
 : Antônio & Manoel and Emilly & Mayla, two pairs of twins, entered the house on day 1 already nominated. The audience had to choose one twin of each pair to stay in the game. On day 7, Mayla and Antonio had the fewest votes and were evicted.
 : Mayara and Vivian won the first Head of Household competition and both had to decide who would get immunity (Mayara) and R$10,000 (Vivian).
 :  By winning a challenge, Roberta got immunity this week. For surviving the twin vote, Emilly and Manoel also had immunity for the first nominations.
 : Starting from this week, the Head of Household competition winner is awarded immunity instead of R$10,000.
 : Luiz Felipe won a double vote power on Monday's night game.
 :  Pedro answered the Big Phone and he was forced to nominate one contestant for eviction. He nominated Ilmar.
 : On Monday night's game, Manoel found a card that gave him the right to be immune to house votes, and could only be nominated by HoH. If he wins the HoH competition or is given immunity from the Power of Immunity holder, he can give the immunity won by the card to another housemate.
 : It was announced that the two housemates with most nomination votes would be nominated alongside the HoH's nominee. 
 : Daniel and Emilly won the Co-Head of Household competition and both had to decide who would get immunity (Emilly) and R$10,000 (Daniel).
 : Marcos won the special Power of Immunity and was safe but it was only revealed after he decided whom would be saved (Rômulo). Rômulo did not gain immunity but a power to nominate one contestant automatically to face eviction. He nominated Daniel. 
 :  Ilmar answered the Phone and was told to choose two contestants to receive a bracelet each, one red and one white, but he was not informed of the meaning of the accessories. Roberta was given the red bracelet and had the power to nominate a contestant for eviction. She nominated Marinalva. Marcos was given the white bracelet and had the power to have a double vote in a special vote which resulted in the division of the house.
 : With the division of the house due to Emilly's fake eviction as she was the most voted to leave by her fellow housemates, the Head of Household competition was contested by the contestants on the Mexican side of the house (Daniel, Emily, Ilmar, Marcos, Marinalva - all of them chose by Emilly to join her in the secret house), while the Power of Immunity competition was contested by the contestants on the American side of the house (Ieda, Vivian, Rômulo, Roberta). 
 : It was announced that the two housemates with most nominations would be nominated alongside the HoH's nominee.
 :  Before the nominations, a quiz about Elettra Lamborghini was realized with the housemates, giving to the winner the power to nominate other housemate for eviction, after the HoH. Marinalva won the quiz and nominated Marcos to face eviction.
 : The winner of the Power of Immunity was automatically saved from nominations on this week.
 : As of this week, only the HoH has immunity.
 : The eleventh HoH's competition was divided into two stages: the first stage, a skill test, was performed only by loved-ones of the five housemates: Emilly's father, Ieda's daughter, Marcos's sister, Marinalva's son and Vivian's mother.  
 : Marcos was ejected on day 78 due to violent behaviour towards Emilly, therefore, the final HoH competition, nominations and eviction were cancelled and Emilly, Ieda and Vivian automatically became the finalists of the season.
 : For the final, the public will vote for the housemate they want to win Big Brother Brasil 17.

References

External links
 Official site 

17
2017 Brazilian television seasons